Mary Lou Graham (later Hamilton; born August 15, 1936) is a former batgirl and relief pitcher who played in the All-American Girls Professional Baseball League.

Born in South Bend, Indiana, Graham attended John Adams High School. In her spare time, she played baseball, basketball and volleyball in local leagues, going through the ups and downs while supporting her beloved South Bend Blue Sox.

Then a dream came true when she joined the Blue Sox as their batgirl in the 1952 season. And to complete her satisfaction, second place South Bend swept fourth place Grand Rapids Chicks in the best-of-three first round, and later claimed the championship title over the Rockford Peaches, 3 to 2 games.

Graham was invited to a try out in South Bend the next year. She attended and was selected as a pitcher for the Blue Sox. Coming out of the bullpen, she hurled eight innings of relief over six games and was not credited with a decision.

After baseball, she got an employment at Bendix Corporation, where she played for the company's bowling team. Besides this, she played semiprofessional softball and basketball from 1955 to 1957 and later became an avid golfer. Graham as her teammates called her, is part of Women in Baseball, a permanent display based at the Baseball Hall of Fame and Museum in Cooperstown, New York and unveiled in 1988 to honor the entire All-American Girls Professional Baseball League.

She also follows Major League Baseball closely, especially at World Series time.

References

All-American Girls Professional Baseball League players
South Bend Blue Sox players
Baseball players from South Bend, Indiana
1936 births
Living people
Bendix Corporation people